In database computing, various utilities for accessing SQL-based databases use variants of the isql moniker - often with an implication of running interactive SQL. They include:

 isql, a Sybase client 
 isql, a unixODBC program
 iSQL, an Altibase utility
 iSQL*Plus, a web-based interface to Oracle's SQL*Plus
 ISQL, Informix SQL - an Informix tool
 ISQL, InterBase SQL command utility
 ISQL, a command-line interface for Microsoft SQL Server